Milka Duno (born April 22, 1972) is a Venezuelan race car driver who competed in the IndyCar Series and ARCA Racing Series. She is best known for holding the record of highest finish for a female driver in the 24 Hours of Daytona. She entered the NASCAR Nationwide Series in 2014.

Duno is a former model and has thus attracted much attention. Her racing career is unusual because of her late start. She was introduced to the sport when she was invited to a driving clinic by a car club in Venezuela and did not start racing until she was 24. Prior to racing her background was primarily academic. Duno holds master's degrees in organizational development, naval architecture, maritime business, and marine biology, and she has prior experience working as a naval engineer.

Biography

Racing career 
Duno began her career as a driver in Venezuela in 1996, finishing 2nd in the Venezuelan GT Championship. In 1998, she placed fourth in the Venezuelan Porsche Supercup Championship. In 1999, she moved to the United States, attended advanced racing schools, and drove in the Barber Dodge Pro Series in 2000. Duno was the first woman in history to win a Ferrari Challenge Race in the USA; at that time she also won her first Series Championship, The Panoz GT Series.

Later in 2000, Duno made her American Le Mans Series debut; she was the first woman to finish in a class podium on this championship. She made her 24 Hours of Daytona debut the next year and her 24 Hours of Le Mans debut a year later. In 2001 and 2003, Duno also competed in the World Series by Nissan open-wheel series in Europe; she became the first woman to score points in this championship. Also in 2001, she was crowned Vice-Champion Driver in the LMP 675 Class of the American Le Mans Series. She scored an impressive four wins in this class, including the prestigious 10 hours Petit Le Mans, becoming the first woman to score a class win in this major international sportscar competition. In 2004 she scored yet another LMP 675 class win in Petit Le Mans.

Beginning in 2004, Duno competed full-time in the Rolex Grand-Am series driving a Pontiac-Riley Daytona Prototype for the Howard-Boss Motorsports team. Duno joined the SAMAX Motorsport team in 2006. For the 2007 24 Hours of Daytona, Duno teamed up with Ryan Dalziel, Darren Manning, and her regular driving partner, Patrick Carpentier; with a second-place finish, Duno became the highest-finishing female in the history of the prestigious race and highest placing Venezuelan driver, eclipsing Ernesto Soto's 5th-place finish in 1982. In the Rolex Sports Car Series Duno scored three impressive and historical overall wins – twice at Homestead-Miami Speedway and once at Le Circuit Mont-Tremblant in Quebec: With her first Rolex Series won at Miami she became the first woman in history to win overall a major international sports car race in North America, Duno was also the first woman to pilot the fastest car in the series – the Daytona Prototype. During her time competing in the Rolex Series Duno earned three overall wins, seven podium appearances, ten top-five finishes, and eighteen top-ten finishes.

Indy Racing League

2007
On March 23, 2007, Duno and her Grand Am Series team, SAMAX Motorsport, sponsored by CITGO, announced that they acquired the equipment to run a 10 race IndyCar series schedule in 2007, including the Indianapolis 500. It was also announced that Duno will no longer run a full schedule in the Grand Am series.

On April 26, 2007, Duno successfully passed her IRL rookie test at Kansas Speedway.  When Duno made the field for the Kansas Lottery Indy 300 (also held at Kansas Speedway) on April 29, 2007, it marked the first time in North American open wheel history that three women (Duno, Danica Patrick and Sarah Fisher) ran in the same race.  Duno stayed out of trouble after qualifying last in the 21-car field and finished 14th.

On May 6, 2007, Duno successfully completed her rookie test for the Indianapolis 500 race. This 91st running of the "Indy 500" was the first where three women were included in the 33-car field.  Duno qualified on May 19, and her speed held through Bump Day. Duno was one of two rookie drivers competing in the Race. She crashed out of the race on lap 65 and finished 31st.

2008
SAMAX chose not to return to the IndyCar Series in 2008.  Duno signed with Dreyer & Reinbold Racing for another partial season schedule (11 races) also sponsored by Citgo.  While practicing and racing alongside veteran teammate and former Indy 500 winner Buddy Rice, throughout the season, Duno began to show a bit of improvement.  Townsend Bell was signed as the driver of the Dreyer & Reinbold #23 during the seven races Milka was not scheduled to drive it.

Milka qualified for her second Indianapolis 500 on the second weekend (due to the second day of qualifications being rained out) and finished 19th. She was the highest finishing female, as Danica Patrick and Sarah Fisher placed 22nd and 24th, respectively.  Although all three women were involved in accidents during the race, Duno was able to reenter the race after her car was moved to the pits, thus making her the only woman running at the end.

2009
Duno returned to Dreyer & Reinbold for the 2009 season driving another part–time schedule (9 races) after driving in the Indy Racing League's pre–season open test at Homestead-Miami Speedway for Newman/Haas/Lanigan Racing. Darren Manning, Tomas Scheckter, and Roger Yasukawa also drove the #23 car when Duno was not racing. She had a best finish of 16th and finished 24th in points.

Duno was also among a record number of nine women to participate in ARCA testing in December 2009 at Daytona International Speedway.

2010
On March 4, 2010, it was announced that Duno would return to the IRL IndyCar Series driving for Dale Coyne Racing full–time for the 2010 season.

Duno failed to qualify for the 2010 Indianapolis 500.  Duno competed in 16 of 17 races on the 2010 schedule and the "DNQ" at Indianapolis was the first and only race that she did not qualify for in her 43 race IndyCar Series career.

On Saturday, August 28, 2010, for the first time in history, Duno (along with Danica Patrick, Simona de Silvestro, Ana Beatriz and Sarah Fisher) qualified and ran in an IndyCar Series race that included five women.  Duno qualified 26th and finished in 19th place.

ARCA Racing Series

2010
Duno made her stock car debut in the ARCA Racing Series' season-opening event at Daytona International Speedway driving the #90 Stringer Motorsports Toyota. She started in 41st place and had picked up 10 positions before being swept up in a 14-car accident on lap 6, ending her day.

2011
Duno signed with Sheltra Motorsports to race in the ARCA Racing Series' season-opening event at Daytona International Speedway. Assigned to the #63 Dodge, the announcement was the culmination of several months' work by the team to sign Duno to race in the event.

In winter testing at Daytona in January, she was seventh fastest in the first morning of testing, and fifth fastest that afternoon, finishing sixth-fastest overall after the first day's test.  For the Lucas Oil Slick Mist 200 at Daytona one month later, Duno qualified 23rd.  She had moved up to 12th place with only 16 laps to go when Duno was caught up in a 9-car crash that ended her day and relegated her to 31st place.

It was announced on April 14, 2011 that Duno would run the entire 2011 ARCA Racing Series presented by Menards season for Sheltra Motorsports.  Over the first five races of the season, Duno had a best starting position of 8th (Talladega) and a best finishing position of 15th (Toledo) with two DNF's.  Duno was originally awarded the pole position due to qualifying being rained out for the Menards 200 presented by Federated Car Care at Toledo Speedway.  Unfortunately, she had to start that race at the back of the field in her backup car due to crashing in the final practice.

Duno's season was then cut short when her car was officially pulled from the entry list eight minutes before the June 3 practice session for the Messina Wildlife Animal Stopper 150 at Chicagoland Speedway due to Sheltra Motorsports's decision to abruptly cease operations.  Milka and Sheltra Motorsports resumed ARCA Series competition with the July 16 Prairie Meadows 200 at Iowa Speedway.  Despite missing seven races, Duno finished 18th in driver points.

In preparation for the 2012 ARCA Series presented by Menards, Duno tested the #63 Citgo Lubricants Sheltra Motorsports Ford during the annual ARCA Daytona International Speedway open test from December 16–18, 2011.  In the six test sessions held, Duno was the only driver fastest in two of the sessions and was second in a third session.

2012
On February 7, 2012, Duno's entry for the Lucas Oil Slick Mist 200 was officially changed from the #63 of Sheltra Motorsports to the #33 of Eddie Sharp Racing. Duno ran both the #33 and #6 of Eddie Sharp Racing in the first 5 races of the 2012 season logging a qualifying high of 16th at Daytona and a high finish of 18th at Mobile. She returned to the series when her crew chief at Sheltra & ESR, Dave Leiner Jr started his own team, Dave Leiner Racing. Duno's first race back was Thunderbolt Raceway at New Jersey Motorsports Park. After qualifying 21st, she finished 10th. This marked her first ARCA top 10 finish, won her the CGS Imaging Hard Charger of the Race award and was the highest place by a Venezuelan driver in ARCA history.

2013

In her first full season in the ARCA Racing Series, Duno finished the 2013 season seventh in driver championship standings, becoming the second highest finishing female driver in ARCA's 61-year history. Duno's season highlights include earning the pole at Talladega Superspeedway and leading the first 11 laps at Daytona International Speedway from her outside row one starting position. Her pole at Talladega ranks her as one of only four female drivers to earn pole positions in the ARCA Racing Series. Over 21 races in 2013, Duno earned a career-best eighth-place finish at Salem Speedway and a 10th-place finish at Winchester Speedway. Overall, she earned 2 top-10 and 13 top-15 finishes. She would also finish the 2013 season third in CGS Imaging Hard Charger points and third in the S&S Volvo Laps Completed points with a total of 2423 laps completed during the season.

NASCAR 
In August 2014, it was announced that Duno had signed with RAB Racing to drive the team's No. 29 Toyota on a limited basis in the NASCAR Nationwide Series. Duno competed in two Nationwide Series races at Kansas Speedway and Homestead-Miami Speedway, crashing out at Kansas and finishing at Homestead. When she qualified for and competed in the race at Kansas she became the first Hispanic female driver in history to compete in a NASCAR national series in the USA. She also competed in one Camping World Truck Series race, in 2014 she ran MAKE Motorsports' No. 1 truck at Talladega Superspeedway, leading two laps.

Off–track activities

Through the Milka Way Foundation that Duno founded in 2004, she is engaged in programs such as visits to schools in many of the cities she races in to encourage youth of all races to achieve more academically.  In 2008, Duno became a movie actress and a published author. Duno played the role of Kellie "Gearbox", a race car driver, in the live-action-from-animated Warner Brothers movie Speed Racer. Duno's bilingual kids book, Go, Milka, Go!, depicted her as an animated character teaching the importance of education. Go, Milka, Go! was awarded the Best Young Adult Sports/Recreation Book of 2009 at the 11th Annual International Latino Book Awards.

Criticism
Duno's IndyCar career was controversial; in a number of instances, she was criticized for running too slow and blocking other drivers.

During the 2007 IndyCar season, Ashley Judd criticized allowing Duno, then a rookie, to race. After the final race, Judd said to reporters, "I know this is not very sportsmanlike, but they've got to get the 23 car (Duno) off the track. It's very dangerous. I'm tired of holding my tongue. She shouldn't be out there. When a car is 10 miles [an hour] off the pace, it's not appropriate to be racing. People's lives are at stake."

In 2008, she was confronted by Danica Patrick after an incident at the Mid-Ohio Sports Car Course for being too slow during a practice session. At the Grand Prix of Toronto and at Iowa Speedway in 2010, she was parked by officials due to her lack of speed and was subsequently placed on probation by IndyCar for consistently poor performance.

Motorsports career results

Complete American Le Mans Series results

Complete 24 Hours of Le Mans results

Complete World Series by Nissan results
(key)

American Open-Wheel racing results
(key) (Races in bold indicate pole position, races in italics indicate fastest race lap)

Barber Dodge Pro Series

IndyCar 

 1 Run on same day.
 2 Non-points paying, exhibition race.

Indianapolis 500

NASCAR
(key) (Bold – Pole position awarded by qualifying time. Italics – Pole position earned by points standings or practice time. * – Most laps led.)

Nationwide Series

Camping World Truck Series

K&N Pro Series East

 Season still in progress
 Ineligible for series points

ARCA Racing Series
(key) (Bold – Pole position awarded by qualifying time. Italics – Pole position earned by points standings or practice time. * – Most laps led.)

References

External links

 
 
 Duno's ARCA Driver Profile Page

Living people
1972 births
Sportspeople from Caracas
Venezuelan racing drivers
24 Hours of Daytona drivers
24 Hours of Le Mans drivers
Indianapolis 500 drivers
IndyCar Series drivers
ARCA Menards Series drivers
Rolex Sports Car Series drivers
American Le Mans Series drivers
Venezuelan people of Italian descent
American female racing drivers
Female IndyCar Series drivers
Barber Pro Series drivers
Venezuelan sportswomen
NASCAR drivers
21st-century American women
Dreyer & Reinbold Racing drivers
Dale Coyne Racing drivers
World Series Formula V8 3.5 drivers
Multimatic Motorsports drivers